Gabriel dos Santos Magalhães (born 19 December 1997) is a Brazilian professional footballer who plays as centre-back for Premier League club Arsenal.

Club career

Avaí
Gabriel Magalhães was born in the Pirituba District of São Paulo. At age 13, Gabriel began his career at Avaí but returned to São Paulo after a week due to homesickness. However, he reconsidered his decision and returned to Avaí after two weeks, eventually going on to earn his first professional contract at age 16. He went on to be part of the team that won promotion to Brasileiro Série A in 2017.

Lille

On 31 January 2017, Gabriel Magalhães joined Ligue 1 side Lille, signing a four and a half-year contract. When he arrived, Gabriel taught himself French and went on to conduct most of his interviews in the language. After playing several matches for Lille B, he was loaned to fellow Ligue 1 side Troyes by then head coach Marcelo Bielsa, before joining Croatian side Dinamo Zagreb, where he made just one league appearance for each club's senior team. 

Gabriel returned to Lille in 2018, starting his first match on 10 February 2019 against relegation-threatened Guingamp in a 2–0 win. He went on to make 14 appearances over the course of the season, scoring his first goal for Lille in a 5–1 win against Paris Saint-Germain on 14 April 2019.

The following season, Gabriel began to play more regularly, forming a centre-back partnership with José Fonte. Gabriel was a starter in all six of Lille's Champions League group stage matches. On 31 January 2020, he extended his contract with Lille until 2023. 

Lille manager Christophe Galtier spoke about the defender's patience, saying "I saw he had great potential and he was able to seize the first opportunity he got. He was hungry to play, and while he bided his time, he worked a lot. He's an example for other youngsters to follow. It's a sort of intelligence to behave like that. How often nowadays do you see players not working if they're not in the squad?"

Arsenal
On 1 September 2020, Arsenal announced the signing of Gabriel Magalhães on a long-term contract. Interest in the Brazilian was reportedly high, with multiple clubs willing to match the valuation set by Lille. Gabriel joined for a fee reaching the region of £27m after add-ons.

2020–21 season
On 12 September, the opening day of the 2020–21 Premier League season, Gabriel made his debut for Arsenal, scoring the second goal in a 3–0 win against Fulham at Craven Cottage. Following his performance in Arsenal's 2–1 win against West Ham on 19 September 2020, Gabriel was awarded Arsenal's player of the month award for September. He won the award again in October after featuring in five of Arsenal's six games in the month. Arsenal manager Mikel Arteta spoke highly of Gabriel's early performances, saying "you move him from France to here at an early age, without talking the language, to adapt to a new way of playing as well... [but] he has done it really quickly and is showing a great mentality as well."

Despite Arsenal's poor form in late 2020, Gabriel was awarded his third player of the month award in December after his performances in Arsenal's 1–0 win against Manchester United on 1 November and their 0–0 draw against Leeds United on 22 November. On 29 November, Gabriel scored his first goal at the Emirates during Arsenal's 2–1 defeat to Wolverhampton Wanderers. Gabriel received his first red card for Arsenal on 16 December in a home game against Southampton, after being given two yellow cards in the space of five minutes for fouls on Ché Adams and Theo Walcott.

2021–22 season
Gabriel played in all but three of Arsenal's Premier League games. He scored his first goal of the season in a 2–0 win at Leicester City on 30 October 2021.

On 1 January 2022, he was sent off in the second half of Arsenal's home game against Manchester City, with the score level at 1–1. With Arsenal down to ten men, Rodri scored the winning goal for City in stoppage time to make it 2–1.

He scored the only goal of the game as Arsenal beat Wolverhampton Wanderers at Molineux on 10 February, and also got the winning goal against West Ham United in a 2–1 win at the London Stadium on 1 May. Gabriel finished the season with five Premier League goals.

2022–23 season
Gabriel scored the winning goal against Fulham on 27 August 2022. He had made a mistake that allowed Aleksandar Mitrović to open the scoring, but his goal in the 86th minute gave Arsenal all three points in a 2–1 win.

On 21 October 2022, Arsenal announced that Gabriel had signed a new long-term contract with the club.

He scored the only goal of the game as Arsenal beat Chelsea at Stamford Bridge in November. On 12 March 2023, he scored against Fulham again, heading in Arsenal's first goal in their 3–0 win at Craven Cottage. This was his third goal in four games against the Cottagers.

International career
Gabriel Magalhães represented Brazil at under-20 level at the 2017 South American U-20 Championship. On 14 November 2020, he made his international debut with Brazil's under-23 national side in a 3–1 win over South Korea's under-23s in an international friendly. On 17 June 2021, he was named in the squad for the 2020 Summer Olympics, but was forced to withdraw with a knee injury on 6 July.

Style of play
Gabriel Magalhães is a left-footed centre-back who normally plays on the left side of a centre-back partnership. However, Gabriel can also play as part of a back three. Despite his height, Gabriel is known for being fast. Christophe Galtier spoke about Gabriel, saying "He has a lot of character for a 22-year-old boy. Despite his 190cm height, he is super fast and covers his side well. He is the player who has won the most aerial duels in the first part of the season." Gabriel is also known for his distribution ability, generally looking to play the ball forward or to the left-back. In the 2019–20 season, Gabriel had completed the most passes into the opposition half in all of Ligue 1. According to his Lille teammate and mentor José Fonte, Gabriel "has to keep defending well by being aggressive, being well positioned, and not taking risks."

Media
Gabriel Magalhães was involved in the Amazon Original sports docuseries All or Nothing: Arsenal, which documented the club by spending time with the coaching staff and players behind the scenes both on and off the field throughout their 2021–22 season.

Career statistics

Club

Honours
Dinamo Zagreb
Prva HNL: 2017–18
Croatian Cup: 2017–18

References

External links
Profile at the Arsenal F.C. website
Profile at the Premier League website

1997 births
Living people
Footballers from São Paulo
Association football defenders
Brazilian footballers
Brazil under-20 international footballers
Campeonato Brasileiro Série B players
Ligue 1 players
Croatian Football League players
Premier League players
Avaí FC players
Lille OSC players
ES Troyes AC players
GNK Dinamo Zagreb players
GNK Dinamo Zagreb II players
Arsenal F.C. players
Brazilian expatriate footballers
Expatriate footballers in France
Expatriate footballers in Croatia
Expatriate footballers in England
Brazilian expatriate sportspeople in France
Brazilian expatriate sportspeople in Croatia
Brazilian expatriate sportspeople in England